Timothy D. Rose (born July 17, 1956) is an American actor and puppeteer, best known for playing Admiral Ackbar in the Star Wars series. In addition, he puppeteered for Salacious B. Crumb, the court jester of Jabba the Hutt, in Star Wars: Episode VI – Return of the Jedi.

Early life
Rose was born in Pittsfield, Illinois on July 17, 1956.

Career

Rose is best known for playing the role of Admiral Ackbar in the third Star Wars film, Return of the Jedi, a role which he played again in Star Wars: The Force Awakens and Star Wars: The Last Jedi. In addition, Rose also puppeteered the characters of Sy Snootles and Salacious Crumb in Return of the Jedi, and has been involved with other Lucasfilm and The Jim Henson Company projects, including The Dark Crystal and Howard the Duck.

He also helped in puppeteering the character of Tik-Tok in Walt Disney Pictures' Return to Oz.

Rose also made the puppets Cosmo and Dibs for the BBC children's series You and Me. They debuted on that show in 1983. He also did assistant puppetry for Barnaby Bear on Becky and Barnaby Bear.

Filmography

Film

Television

References

External links
 Official website
 

1956 births
Living people
American male actors
People from Pittsfield, Illinois